Carlberg is an American advertising agency founded in 1971.

Based in Houston, Texas, Carlberg services include marketing, advertising, branding, media planning and buying, etc.

Previous names include Richards/Carlberg as well as Rives Carlberg and Smith, Smith, Baldwin & Carlberg.

References
 "Richards/Carlberg Overview," BusinessWeek
 "Richards/Carlberg adds RiceTec to portfolio," Houston Business Journal
 "Richards/Carlberg hosts media party," Houston Chronicle

External links
Carlberg Official Website

Advertising agencies of the United States
Companies based in Houston